An escape pod, escape capsule, life capsule, or lifepod is a capsule or craft, usually only big enough for one person, used to escape from a vessel in an emergency. An escape ship is a larger, more complete craft also used for the same purpose. Escape pods are ubiquitous in science fiction but are only used in a few real vehicles.

Real life
 Because they were intended to fly too high and fast for safe use of conventional ejection seats, the Bell X-2, B-58 Hustler, XB-70 Valkyrie, F-111 and B‑1A Lancer all used enclosed escape crew capsules of some kind.
 The single submarine of the Soviet "Mike"-class, K-278 Komsomolets had an escape capsule, which was jettisoned upon its sinking in 1989. Other Soviet submarines like the Oscar-class are only rumored to have escape capsules. During the sinking of the Kursk, the crew was unable to reach it. Also the Typhoon-class is rumored to have escape pods located near or in the sail. Evidence for this can be found in a German documentary on the Typhoon-class submarine Severstal.

Fiction
In the 1950 science fiction aviation film Chain Lightning, the advanced experimental jet fighter, the JA-4, can achieve 1400 MPH at an altitude of 90,000 feet. It is equipped with a new, untried pilot escape pod that is tested safely at the very end of the film.
 In the 1966 film Thunderbirds Are Go, the Zero-X spacecraft features an escape pod, referred to in the film as an "Escape Unit", capable of evacuating the Zero-X's five-man crew in one go in case of a serious emergency.
Many spacecraft in the Star Wars franchise are equipped with escape pods. A notable appearance is in the first film, in which an escape pod is used by R2-D2 and C-3PO.
 Spaceball One, the enormous spacecraft featured in the 1987 science fiction parody film Spaceballs, is seen to be equipped with one-person escape pods. Dark Helmet is kicked out of one by the Bearded Lady (even though the doorway to the pod was designed in the shape of his helmet, signifying the pod was intended for his use), and President Skroob tries to leave on the last one but finds it already occupied by a bear.
 In The Simpsons episode "Homer Goes to College", Mr. Burns uses an escape pod to escape from a nuclear meltdown.
 In the 1997 political action thriller film Air Force One, U.S. President James Marshall, played by Harrison Ford, pretends to have escaped the presidential aircraft after terrorist hijacking by using an escape pod. It is later revealed that Marshall had remained onboard, hidden in a cargo hold, to fight the terrorists and ultimately regain control of the plane. The actual VC-25A, which is the principal aircraft used to transport the U.S. President, does not contain an escape pod or a parachute ramp.
 In the G.I. Joe: A Real American Hero comic books, the Joes' underground base, the Pit, had an escape pod in the form of a drill tank. Similar drill tanks (named Mole Pods) would appear in the 2009 film G.I. Joe: The Rise of Cobra, but for the reverse purpose – to invade the Pit. 
 In the 2008 science fiction film WALL-E, the BNL starliner Axiom is depicted as having numerous six-person escape pods aboard. These pods are able to deploy a parachute, inflate a raft on their underside in case of a water landing, and deploy flares. They also have artificial gravity through some means, as indicated by WALL-E not floating weightlessly even after the pod he is in is well away from the Axiom. Strangely for vehicles designed to keep their occupants alive, the Axiom escape pods are also demonstrated to have a self-destruct sequence included.
 Capital ships of the United Nations Space Command (UNSC) in the Halo video game series are shown to feature nine-person escape pods; in the first mission of Halo: Combat Evolved, the first game in the series, the Master Chief leaves the UNSC Pillar of Autumn on an escape pod.
 In the 2010 video game Mass Effect 2, the SSV Normandy is heavily damaged in a Collector surprise attack at the beginning of the game, prompting the crew to abandon ship aboard multi-person escape pods. Most, but not all, of the crew makes it to the pods before Normandy is destroyed and are later picked up by the Systems Alliance Navy.
 In the 2004 video game Unreal II: The Awakening, the main character John Dalton completes the game's final mission by abandoning the spacecraft Dorian Gray on a one-person escape pod.
 In the 2017 video game Subnautica, the player escapes the Aurora using an escape pod at the beginning of the game. These two-person "life pods" are demonstrated in-game to have essential supplies such as food, water, medical kits, a radio, and a crafting device.
 In the 2017 video game Prey, the player can try to escape Talos I with the help of two escape pods: the one above Alex Yu's office and the other which is one of the few pods that can be repaired. However, both the pods fail after initiation of the escape process and Morgan Yu dies requiring the player to start over.
 In the Star Trek universe, every starship in Starfleet is equipped with escape pods.
 In the 2018 film Bumblebee, escape pods are used by the Autobots to escape the planet Cybertron, as they are scattered across the galaxy before joining Bumblebee to arrive on Earth.
In the 2018 film Incredibles 2, the Underminer uses an escape pod to flee with his spoils after robbing a bank vault. The pod is a miniaturized version of his subterrene, tipped with a drill.

See also

References

Aircraft emergency systems
Fictional spacecraft by type
Rescue equipment